Awase may refer to:
Awase, a tidal flat in Misato-son, Okinawa City
Awase Airfield, a WWII airfield in Okinawa
Awase Housing Area, US Forces residential area and former site of Kubasaki High School, Okinawa
Awase (album), a 2018 album by Nik Bärtsch's Ronin

See also
E-awase (絵合), painting contest among Japanese nobles during the Kamakura period
Kai-awase (貝合わせ),Japanese game with shells 
Uta-awase (歌合せ), Japanese poetry contest